Adult alternative may refer to:

Adult album alternative, a radio format
Modern adult contemporary, a radio format
Smooth jazz, a radio format